Asadabad (also Romanized as Āsadābād) is a village in Jereh Rural District, Jereh and Baladeh District, Kazerun County, Fars Province, Iran. At the 2006 census, its population was 46, in 7 families.

References 

Populated places in Kazerun County